The legislative district of Tawi-Tawi is the representation of the province of Tawi-Tawi in the various national legislatures of the Philippines. The province is currently represented in the lower house of the Congress of the Philippines through its lone congressional district.

History 

Prior to gaining separate representation, areas now under the jurisdiction of Tawi-Tawi were represented under the Department of Mindanao and Sulu (1917–1935), Sulu (1935–1972) and Region IX (1978–1984).

The enactment of Presidential Decree No. 302 on September 11, 1973 created the Province of Tawi-Tawi out of Sulu's western and southern municipalities. The new province was represented in the Interim Batasang Pambansa as part of Region IX from 1978 to 1984.

Tawi-Tawi first gained separate representation in 1984 when it returned one representative, elected at large, to the Regular Batasang Pambansa.

Under the new Constitution which was proclaimed on February 11, 1987, the province constituted a lone congressional district, and elected its member to the restored House of Representatives starting that same year.

Lone District 
Population (2015): 390,715

Notes

At-Large (defunct)

See also 
Legislative district of Mindanao and Sulu
Legislative districts of Sulu

References 

Tawi-Tawi
Politics of Tawi-Tawi